The following is a list of episodes for The Little Lulu Show, an animated series based on the homonymous character and her comic books created by Marjorie Henderson Buell (better known as "Marge"). It was produced by CINAR Animation, with the only co-production of TMO Loonland for Season 3.

Series overview
{| class="wikitable plainrowheaders" style="text-align:center;"
|-
! colspan="2" rowspan="2" |Season
! rowspan="2" |Episodes
! colspan="2" |Originally aired
|-
! First aired
! Last aired
|-
|style="background-color:#66B3FF;" |
|1
|6
|
|
|-
|style="background-color:#FFFF00;" |
|2
|20
|
|
|-
|style="background-color:#B60000;" |
|3
|26
|
|
|}

Episodes

Season 1 (1995-1996)
This is the first season to use cel animation.

Season 2 (1996-1997)
This is the last season to use cel animation.

Season 3 (1998–99)

Shorts
These special mini-episodes, shown with the title of "Lulu-Bite", were transmitted only in the first 2 seasons (from 1995 to 1996) as an interlude between 1 episode and another. They are all musically themed and the characters do not speak.

Lists of American children's animated television series episodes
Lists of Canadian children's animated television series episodes